Donald Norman Winch,  (15 April 1935 – 12 June 2017) was a British economist and academic. He was Professor of the History of Economics at the University of Sussex from 1969 to 2000, and its Pro-Vice-Chancellor (Arts and Social Studies) from 1986 to 1989.

Early life and education
Winch was born on 15 April 1935 to Sidney and Iris Winch. He was educated at Sutton Grammar School, an all-boys state grammar school in London. Having received state scholarship, he studied economics at the London School of Economics, University of London, and graduated with a Bachelor of Science (BSc) degree in 1956. He received a scholarship to pursue graduate studies at Princeton University, where he received a Ph.D. in economics in 1960 after completing a doctoral dissertation titled "The political economy of colonization: a study in the development of the attitude of the English classical school to Empire."

Academic career
After teaching at the University of California (1959 to 1960), and at the University of Edinburgh (1960 to 1963), Winch joined the University of Sussex. He was a lecturer in economics from 1963 to 1966, Reader in Economics from 1966 to 1969, and Professor of the History of Economics from 1969 to 2000. He also served as Dean of the School of Social Sciences from 1968 to 1974, and Pro-Vice-Chancellor (Arts and Social Studies) from 1986 to 1989. He retired from full-time academia in 2000, and was appointed professor emeritus.

Later life
Winch died on 12 June 2017, aged 82.

Honours
In 1986, Winch was elected a Fellow of the British Academy (FBA). He was also an elected Fellow of the Royal Historical Society (FRHistS).

Selected works

References

1935 births
2017 deaths
British economists
Academics of the University of Sussex
People educated at Sutton Grammar School
Economic historians
Alumni of the London School of Economics
Fellows of the British Academy
Fellows of the Royal Historical Society
Princeton University alumni
People from London